Markapukyu (Quechua marka village / storey, pukyu spring of water, Hispanicized spelling Marcapuquio) is an archaeological site in Peru.

See also 
 Kunturmarka
 Qaqapatan
 Q'illaywasin

References

Archaeological sites in Pasco Region
Archaeological sites in Peru